Wilfried Delbroek (born 25 August 1972) is a Belgian former professional footballer who played as a defender. He made five appearances for the Belgium national team in 1999.

Honours
Genk
Belgian First Division: 1998–99, 2001–02
Belgian Cup: 1997–98, 1999–2000

References

External links
 

1972 births
Living people
People from Maaseik
Belgian footballers
Association football defenders
Belgium international footballers
Belgian Pro League players
K.R.C. Genk players
K.S.K. Tongeren players
Footballers from Limburg (Belgium)